Bukowice may refer to:

Bukowice, Milicz County in Lower Silesian Voivodeship (south-west Poland)
Bukowice, Wołów County in Lower Silesian Voivodeship (south-west Poland)
Bukowice, Lublin Voivodeship (east Poland)